Helene Fuld may refer to:

 Helene Fuld College of Nursing, New York City, founded in 1945
 Helene Fuld Health Trust, a trust for nursing education, founded in 1935 as the Helene Fuld Health Foundation
 Helene Fuld Health Trust Simulation Center at the Columbia University School of Nursing, New York City
 Helene Fuld Multimedia Center at Godchaux Hall, Vanderbilt University
 Helene Fuld Health Trust National Institute for Evidence-based Practice in Nursing and Healthcare, Ohio State University.
 College of Health Professions, Helene Fuld School of Nursing of Coppin State University  (originally of Provident Hospital, Baltimore)
 Helene Fuld School of Nursing, closed 2011, of Capital Health Regional Medical Center, William McKinley Memorial Hospital, Trenton, New Jersey
 Carolyn Sifton-Helene Fuld Library, at the University of Manitoba